The British Security Industry Association (BSIA), based in London and Worcester, United Kingdom, is a British trade association founded in January 1967 in London. It represents the UK security industry.

The BSIA represents about 70% of the UK private security industry with members ranging from SMEs to international organisations. Mike Reddington was appointed as chief executive of the BSIA in January 2019.

Reddington has worked in the private security industry for over 25 years. He began his career in electronic engineering, joining Philips Business Systems in February 1984 as an installation service technician. In October 1988, Reddington moved into a sales role at Guardall before taking up the post of sales director at Gardiner Technology in January 1994.

Reddington would later take on the sales and marketing director position at Honeywell. December 2004 saw him become managing director for the UK and Ireland at ADI-Gardiner, a role which Reddington held for three years prior to attaining the post of general manager for the EMEA region with ADI Global Distribution. Most recently, Reddington served as managing director of Videcon (from April 2015 through to January 2018) and then founded the RedRose Consultancy with a view to helping business negotiate the key areas of strategy, sales, marketing, operations, organisational structure and/or acquisition integration. He holds an MBA from Leeds University's business school.

Former chief executive of the BSIA, James Kelly, stepped down in 2018 after nine years at the organisation. The interim period saw David Wilkinson, director of technical services, take up the position. 
The BSIA is an Accredited Trade Organisation (ATO) for the security industry giving it the lead for assisting UK security companies to exhibit at overseas trade shows. The BSIA has led export pavilions at trade shows at IFSEC South East Asia in  Kuala Lumpur, Security Essen in Germany and INTERSEC Dubai in the Middle East.

The BSIA has been described as "the main trade body" for the security guarding industry in the UK.

References

1967 establishments in the United Kingdom
Trade associations based in the United Kingdom
Organisations based in Worcestershire
Security organizations
Worcester, England